Darren Capovilla is an Australian former professional rugby league footballer who played in the 1990s and 2000s. He played for Parramatta and Western Suburbs in the NSWRL competition.

Playing career
Capovilla made his first grade debut for Parramatta in round 21 of the 1993 NSWRL season against Canberra at Bruce Stadium. Capovilla played off the bench in Parramatta's 68–0 defeat which as of 2022 is still the clubs record defeat. In 1996, Capovilla joined Western Suburbs and enjoyed a successful season where the club qualified for the finals. Capovilla played in Western Suburbs 20-12 elimination finals loss to Cronulla at Parramatta Stadium. This would prove to be the last time Western Suburbs would qualify for the finals. In 1997, Capovilla played eight matches. Capovilla's final game for Western Suburbs was their 39–18 loss to wooden spooners South Queensland. The loss meant Western Suburbs missed the finals with the Gold Coast Chargers leapfrogging them in the process. In 2000, Capovilla represented Italy in three matches of the 2000 emerging nations tournament scoring two tries.

References

1973 births
Western Suburbs Magpies players
Italy national rugby league team players
Parramatta Eels players
Australian rugby league players
Rugby league props
Living people